Minuscule 222 (in the Gregory-Aland numbering), A404 (Soden), is a Greek minuscule manuscript of the New Testament, on paper. Palaeographically it has been assigned to the 14th century. The manuscript has not survived in complete condition.

Description 

The codex contains a complete text of the four Gospels, on 346 paper leaves (size ), with some lacunae (Matthew 1:1-6:19; John 14:2-16:4; 16:7-fin). It is written in one column per page, 24-32 lines per page.

It contains a commentary (Victor's in Mark).

Aland did not place the Greek text of the codex in any Category.
It was not examined by the Claremont Profile Method. In result his textual character is unknown.

History 

The manuscript was brought by Busbecq from Constantinople (along with Minuscule 123 and 221). C. R. Gregory saw it in 1887. 

It is currently housed at the Austrian National Library (Theol. Gr. 180), at Vienna.

See also 
 List of New Testament minuscules
 Biblical manuscript
 Textual criticism

References

Further reading

External links 
 

Greek New Testament minuscules
14th-century biblical manuscripts
Biblical manuscripts of the Austrian National Library